Mircea is a three-masted barque, built in 1938 in Hamburg by the Blohm & Voss shipyard as a training vessel for the Romanian Navy. The ship is named after the Wallachian Voivode, Mircea the Elder. After World War II she was temporarily taken over by the USSR, but later returned to Romania. In 1966, she was overhauled by Blohm & Voss.

History

On 22 September 1938, the ship was launched and named Mircea after its predecessor NMS Mircea. The name of the ship comes from Voivode Mircea the Elder, who ruled Wallachia between 1386 and 1418, under whose reign the local navigation and the trade carried out at sea experienced great development, with Wallachian ships sailing not only in the Black Sea but also in the Aegean Sea and Mediterranean Sea. On the bow, the ship has a figurehead representing the ruler dressed in a blue blouse, red cloak and wearing a crown on his head.

The national flag raising ceremony took place on 27 April 1939 and on 1 May 1939, the ship entered service. Mircea entered the port of Constanța on 17 May 1939, being greeted by officials and young students of the Naval School and the ships docked in the port, including the old NMS Mircea.

On 3 July 1939, Mircea left for her first training voyage in the Mediterranean Sea, stopping at the ports of Palermo, Toulon, Palma, Gibraltar, Algiers and Alexandria. The last part of the voyage, which included visits to Syria, Cyprus and the Greek Islands, was canceled because of the German attack on Poland. Thus, on 3 September 1939, Mircea returned to Constanța where it was docked at the military berth.

The outbreak of the Second World War would mean the beginning of a long period, over 25 years, in which Mircea did not execute any long voyages representing Romania outside the Black Sea. For safety, on 19 February 1941, the ship was docked at Brăila on the Arapu arm of the Danube. She stayed there until the summer of 1944. In September 1944, she was taken by Soviet authorities. Two years later, on 27 May 1946, she was returned to the Romanian Navy.

Between 1946 and 1947, the ship went through some repair works, mainly on the masts. The training voyages resumed in 1947, though only short ones in the Black Sea. In 1963, following some favorable regulations between the Romanian and the American government, an invitation came on behalf of president John F. Kennedy, for the school ship Mircea to visit American ports and to participate in a series of festivities. Although not honored, the invitation still attracted the attention of the First Secretary of the Romanian Communist Party, Gheorghe Gheorghiu-Dej. A year later, in 1964, the ship participated in festivities on the Romanian Navy Day. On this occasion, it was decided that Mircea should be repaired and modernized.

In 1965, she went through a powerful storm while traversing the Bay of Biscay on her way to Hamburg, nearly running aground at Chaussée de Sein. On 19 January 1966, the ship, together with its tugboats, arrived at Hamburg where on 24 August the repair and modernization work started. It returned to Constanța on 7 November 1966.

On 4 July 1976, Mircea participated in the Grand Parade of Sailing Ships of the United States Bicentennial at New York. Between 1977 and 1994, the school ship Mircea performed voyages on the Black Sea and Mediterranean Sea, according to the plans of practical training of students, but also of representation.

On 4 October 1994, modernization works were carried out at the Brăila shipyard, which were completed in 2002. In 2004, she participated in the "Tall Ships Challenge - 2004". In the following year, the ship received numerous invitations to participate in various events. Thus, she participated in the festivities of the 175th anniversary of Belgium at Zeebrugge, in the festivities of the National Day of France at Cherbourg, she participated in the "Tall Ships Race 2005", in the "SAIL Bremerhaven 2005" at Bremerhaven and at the "SAIL Amsterdam 2005" festival in the Netherlands. In 2007, Mircea participated in "The Tall Ships' Races 2007". The Mircea school ship also participated in other international regattas: "Black Sea Tall Ship Race Regatta 2014" in the Black Sea, "The Tall Ships Races 2017" in the Baltic Sea, "The Liberty Tall Ship Regatta 2019" in the English Channel and North Sea.

Sovereigns, heads of state, fleet commanders, generals, admirals, politicians and personalities from the world of culture and science have boarded the ship throughout its existence. With over 80 years of service, the ship has become a true ambassador of Romania, with visitors always being impressed by the way the ship is maintained given its age.

Sister ships 
  (ex Tovarishch (1951 to 2003))
  (1936, ex Horst Wessel)
  (1937, ex Albert Leo Schlageter)
 Herbert Norkus (begun 1939, unfinished)
  (1958)

Gallery 

Mircea at Toulon, Tall Ships' Races, 2007

Mircea at Brest, 2008

Mircea at Heraklion, 2016

Mircea at Sète, 2022

References

External links 

  Home page of Mircea at the Naval Academy in Constanța, Romania 

Ships of the Romanian Naval Forces
Tall ships of Germany
Tall ships of Romania
Barques
1938 ships
Gorch Fock-class sailing ships